The boys' 100 metre butterfly event at the 2018 Summer Youth Olympics took place on 8 and 9 October at the Natatorium in Buenos Aires, Argentina.

Results

Heats
The heats were started on 8 October at 10:30.

Semifinals
The semifinals were started on 8 October at 18:32.

Swim-off
The swim-off was held on 9 October at 11:29.

Final
The final was held on 9 October at 18:46.

References

Swimming at the 2018 Summer Youth Olympics